Dwight Fitzgerald Bramble (born 27 October 1967) is a Vincentian politician, serving as Member of Parliament for East Kingstown since 30 November 2020.  He is a former goalkeeper for the national football team.

Early life 
Bramble was born in Saint Vincent and the Grenadines on 27 October 1967.  He earned a B.A. and an M.A. in Economics from Old Dominion University.

Football 
Bramble played for the Old Dominion Monarchs while in university.  He was the team's goalkeeping leader in 1983, and a letter winner during 1983-1986.

Bramble played for the Saint Vincent and the Grenadines national football team between 1992 and 2004.  He was goalkeeper for the squad that played in the 1995 Caribbean Cup as well as in the 1996 Gold Cup in the United States.  He also took part in 1994 FIFA World Cup qualification and 1998 FIFA World Cup qualification.  From 1995 to 1996, he played for Hotspurs FC.

Government 
Bramble worked at the Ministry of Finance, Planning and Economic Development, reaching the rank of Senior Projects Officer.  In October 2000, he was appointed Deputy Chief of Mission at the Vincentian Embassy to the U.S.  By 2005, he became the Director of the Organization of American States office in Suriname, a position he held until 2011.  He later moved to Canada.  After working as a lecturer at the University of Regina, he was hired as the economic development coordinator of the city of Estevan in 2017.

Politics 
Bramble was nominated as the New Democratic Party's candidate for East Kingstown in the 2020 general election.  He would succeed retiring MP Arnhim Eustace, a former prime minister who had held the seat for the NDP since 1998.  Bramble won against the Unity Labour Party's three-time candidate Luke Browne.  Bramble and the other members of parliament were sworn in at the first session on 30 November 2020.

References 

1967 births
Living people
Members of the House of Assembly of Saint Vincent and the Grenadines
New Democratic Party (Saint Vincent and the Grenadines) politicians
Saint Vincent and the Grenadines civil servants
Saint Vincent and the Grenadines diplomats
Saint Vincent and the Grenadines expatriates in Canada
Saint Vincent and the Grenadines international footballers
Association football goalkeepers
Saint Vincent and the Grenadines footballers
Old Dominion Monarchs men's soccer players
Organization of American States people